Steve Frame is a fictional character from the NBC daytime soap opera Another World.

He was first portrayed by George Reinholt from 1968 to 1975 (Reinholt returned in 1989 for the show's 25th anniversary playing Steve as a ghost) and David Canary from 1981 to 1983. During the six-year gap between Reinholt and Canary, Steve was presumed dead in a helicopter crash in Australia. When David Canary assumed the role, it was explained that Steve had plastic surgery on his face but had amnesia all those years until he returned to Bay City.

Character history
Born in 1940 in Chadwell, Oklahoma, Steven Frame was one of eight children born to Henry and Jenny Frame. His siblings included sisters Emma Frame Ordway, Janice Frame and Sharlene Frame Watts, and brothers Vince Frame, Willis Frame, Jason Frame, and Henry Frame Jr. A self-made millionaire land developer and half-owner of the Bay City Bangles, the town's football team, Steven Frame first came to Bay City in 1967 on business and pretty much kept a low profile, but didn't make his society debut until the following year when he attended the wedding of District Attorney Walter Curtain to Lenore Moore on July 1, 1968.

At the reception held at the Bay City Country Club, Steve introduced himself to Lenore's best friend and bridesmaid, Alice Matthews (Jacqueline Courtney). It was also at the reception that he met Alice's scheming, money-hungry sister-in-law Rachel Matthews (Robin Strasser). Steve and Alice were instantly smitten with each other and began dating. Steve fell head over heels for Alice, who was the only person to call to him by his full first name Steven. Alice was also delighted when he hired her father Jim to handle the accounting for Steve's Bay City office. Though she was encouraged by Rachel not to let her handsome and rich suitor get away, Alice was completely unaware at first of Rachel's true intentions: she wanted Steve for herself and was determined to have him, and even went as far as to find any excuse to double-date with Alice and Steve with her husband, Russ Matthews (Sam Groom), Alice's brother and a newly interned doctor.

Rachel couldn't understand what Steve saw in Alice. She was too sweet and too nice. Rachel believed he needed a real woman, and she was determined to be that woman to him. Steve had something in common with Rachel that he didn't have with Alice: they both came from similarly poor backgrounds, though Steve's was far more impoverished than Rachel's (a 1972 flashback episode suggests that Steve grew up in a broken family in which his father was abusive). One night Rachel visited Steve in his apartment; he was depressed after a fight he had with Alice. Taking full advantage of Steve's vulnerability, Rachel seduced him. Rachel destroyed Steve and Alice's wedding plans when, on the night of Alice and Steve's engagement party, she confronted Alice and told her that not only did she love Steve but that she was carrying his baby. A cold and calm Alice later confronted Steve and asked him about his infidelity and if it was possible that he was the father of Rachel's baby. Steve finally admitted that it could be possible. Rachel gave birth to a boy and named him James Gerald "Jamie" Matthews and passed him off as Russ's child. Russ eventually found out the truth and divorced Rachel.

As the 1970s ushered in, Steve and Alice finally married in September 1971. Their marriage lasted until June 1973 after endless obstacles ripped them apart. Rachel (now played by Victoria Wyndham) was still determined to have Steve for herself and happily used their son as a weapon. Alice suffered a miscarriage and left Bay City for New York City. There she found employment as a private nurse to a young boy named Dennis Carrington (Mike Hammett). Steve married Rachel in order to give Jamie (Robert Doran) a stable family, but he still longed for Alice. Alice had moved back to Bay City and Steve begged her not to marry Dennis's father, Eliot (James Douglas). Alice agreed to give him a second chance. Steve asked Rachel for a divorce, but she was would not give it to him. Desperate, Steve resorted to bribing Rachel's father, Gerald Davis, to testify on his behalf when he sued Rachel for divorce, which was eventually granted with her gaining full custody of Jamie. 

Bribing his father-in-law would soon come back to haunt Steve when Gerald mouthed off to John Randolph (Michael M. Ryan), Steve's attorney and brother-in-law (John's wife Pat was Alice's sister) that Steve bribed him to testify, thinking John was in on Steve's scheme. John informed the police of Gerald's accusation towards Steve. As a result of John's betrayal, Steve was arrested, but was given permission to remarry Alice on May 4, 1974 (Another World'''s 10th anniversary).

Steve was ordered to report to prison the very next day after their wedding and serve a sentence of six months. Shortly after Steve's incarceration, Alice suffered a mental breakdown. She was eventually committed to a sanitarium and once released was determined to reunite with Steve. Rachel was still furious over Steve going back to Alice and threatened to kick Alice out of the home that Steve had built for her, believing she was entitled to live there as the mother of his son. Several months later when Rachel planned to move in, she was shocked to see Steve waiting for her, accompanied by her stepfather Gil McGowan (Dolph Sweet), the town police chief, in whose custody Steve was temporarily released into. Steve put an end to her moving in right then and there.

When Steve was officially released from prison he then went to see Alice, but she rejected him. Rachel continued to scheme to keep them apart, but Steve and Alice eventually got back together. In May 1975, just as she and Steve were getting their lives back in order, Alice, and all of Bay City, received tragic news: Steve was presumed dead in a helicopter crash in Australia, where he had gone on business. It was also at this time that both women in Steve's life were undergoing major changes: Alice was in the process of adopting an orphaned girl named Sally Spencer, and Rachel, with the help of the love of her current husband, magazine publisher Mac Cory (Douglass Watson), was beginning to renounce her evil ways to become a compassionate and loving woman (though they had their own rocky relationship). Alice (now played by Susan Harney) tried her best to move on, but never really found true love. She left Bay City for a time, but eventually returned.

Six years later, in October 1981, a mysterious businessman named Edward Black (David Canary) arrived in Bay City, studying pictures and news clippings on Alice (now played by Linda Borgeson). Alice was at that time engaged to Mac Cory, who was divorced from Rachel. But it soon became clear that Edward Black was not the man he claimed to be. At a formal party, Black dropped a bombshell that shocked all of Bay City: he was actually Steve Frame! Apparently Steve had survived the crash in Australia years earlier, but had suffered from amnesia and had plastic surgery on his face. He had returned not only to be with Alice and Jamie (now played by Richard Bekins), but also to resume his position as head of Frame Construction. Alice had broken off her engagement to Mac after Steve's return and they tried to resume their relationship, but after being trapped at one of his construction sites with Rachel, their attraction was resurrected and they reunited. Rachel and Steve were driving to the airport (on their way to get remarried) when they crashed their car. Steve was killed and Rachel survived, but was blinded. Six months later, having regained her sight and realizing that she never stopped loving Mac, Rachel remarried him for the third (and last) time in a double ceremony with Mac's son Sandy Cory (Christopher Rich) and Sandy's bride, Blaine Ewing (Laura Malone).

Though Jamie loved Mac as a father, he never forgot Steve. When Jamie (now played by Laurence Lau) welcomed a son with his wife Vicky (Anne Heche), they named him Steven.

Six years after Steve's death, he would return again, but as a ghost (George Reinholt reprised his role for Another World'''s 25th anniversary) to help Rachel, who was having an out-of-body experience while her body was lying unconscious, overcome with gas, in the engine room of a yacht where the 25th anniversary party for Cory Publishing was being held. She was being enticed by the spirit of Steve's evil sister Janice Frame (Christine Jones) to die, but Steve arrived and told Rachel that it wasn't her time to die yet and that she needed to go back, which she did.

Later, Steve visited Jamie, who was struggling over the fact Vicky had lied to him and that he might not be Steven's father. Steve gave Jamie some words of wisdom and told him how proud he was of the man he turned out to be. Steve told his only son he loved him and faded away forever into eternity.

References

http://www.anotherworldhomepage.com/1steve.html

Television characters introduced in 1968
Another World (TV series) characters